Potts Camp is a town in Marshall County, Mississippi, United States. The population was 523 at the 2010 census.

History

Potts Camp is rooted in a trading post established along the Pontotoc Trail by Colonel Erasmus Potts in the mid-19th century.  The town incorporated in 1912.

Geography
Potts Camp is located at  (34.647997, -89.304598).  The town is located northeast of Oxford along Mississippi Highway 178.  Interstate 22 passes through the northern part of town.  Oaklimeter Creek, a tributary of the Tippah River, runs along Potts Camp's southwestern boundary

Demographics

2020 census

As of the 2020 United States Census, there were 416 people, 257 households, and 145 families residing in the town.

2000 census
As of the census of 2000, there were 494 people, 195 households, and 135 families residing in the town. The racial makeup of the town was 66.60% White, 32.59% African American, and 0.81% from two or more races. Hispanic or Latino of any race were 0.61% of the population.

There were 195 households, out of which 36.9% had children under the age of 18 living with them, 43.6% were married couples living together, 20.0% had a female householder with no husband present, and 30.3% were non-families. 26.2% of all households were made up of individuals, and 10.8% had someone living alone who was 65 years of age or older. The average household size was 2.53 and the average family size was 3.01.

In the town, the population was spread out, with 29.4% under the age of 18, 10.5% from 18 to 24, 28.1% from 25 to 44, 20.6% from 45 to 64, and 11.3% who were 65 years of age or older. The median age was 31 years. For every 100 females, there were 85.0 males. For every 100 females age 18 and over, there were 81.8 males.

The median income for a household in the town was $23,472, and the median income for a family was $30,903. Males had a median income of $28,333 versus $21,875 for females. The per capita income for the town was $11,600. About 20.1% of families and 23.0% of the population were below the poverty line, including 27.0% of those under age 18 and 18.8% of those age 65 or over.

Education
The Town of Potts Camp is served by the Marshall County School District.

Notable people
 Bob Boyd, former Major League Baseball player.
 Kenny Brown (blues guitarist)

References

External links

Towns in Marshall County, Mississippi
Towns in Mississippi
Memphis metropolitan area